Olaf Eller (born June 13, 1960) is a Danish ice hockey coach. He is currently the head coach of Denmark men's national junior ice hockey team. His son is Lars Eller, who was drafted 13th overall to the St. Louis Blues in 2007 and currently plays for the Washington Capitals with whom he won the Stanley Cup in the 2018 NHL season. His son Mads Eller won the Memorial Cup with the Edmonton Oil Kings of the Western Hockey League, and currently plays for the Gentofte Stars in the Danish Metal Ligaen.

Career statistics

References

External links

1960 births
Living people
Danish ice hockey coaches
Danish ice hockey right wingers
Nordsjælland Cobras players
Rødovre Mighty Bulls players